Kamyshinka is a rural locality (a selo) in Silantyevsky Selsoviet, Birsky District, Bashkortostan, Russia. The population was 117 as of 2010. There are 6 streets.

Geography 
Kamyshinka is located 18 km south of Birsk (the district's administrative centre) by road. Mordvinovka is the nearest rural locality.

References 

Rural localities in Birsky District